Sandomierz Governorate was an administrative unit (governorate) of Congress Poland.

History
It was created in 1837 from the Sandomierz Voivodeship, and had the same borders and capital (Radom) as the voivodeship. Its lower levels of administration were also mostly unchanged, although renamed from obwóds to powiats. Reform of 1844 merged the governorate with Kielce Governorate, creating a new entity, the Radom Governorate.

References
Geographical Dictionary of the Kingdom of Poland

Governorates of Congress Poland
History of Lesser Poland
Sandomierz
States and territories established in 1837